"There's No Love in Tennessee" is a song written by Stephen Allen Davis and Dennis Morgan, and it was recorded by American country music artist Barbara Mandrell. It was released in February 1985 as the first single from her Greatest Hits compilation album. The song reached number 7 on the Billboard Hot Country Singles & Tracks chart.

Chart performance

References

1985 singles
1985 songs
Barbara Mandrell songs
Songs written by Stephen Allen Davis
Songs written by Dennis Morgan (songwriter)
Song recordings produced by Tom Collins (record producer)
MCA Records singles